An aero-engined car is an automobile powered by an engine designed for aircraft use. Most such cars have been built for racing, and many have attempted to set world land speed records. While the practice of fitting cars with aircraft engines predates World War I by a few years, it was most popular in the interwar period between the world wars when military-surplus aircraft engines were readily available and used to power numerous high-performance racing cars. Initially powered by piston aircraft engines, a number of post-World War II aero-engined cars have been powered by aviation turbine and jet engines instead. Piston-engined, turbine-engined, and jet-engined cars have all set world land speed records. There have also been some non-racing automotive applications for aircraft engines, including production vehicles such as the Tucker 48 and prototypes such as the Chrysler Turbine Car, Fiat Turbina, and General Motors Firebirds. In the late 20th century and into the 21st century, there has also been a revival of interest in piston-powered aero-engined racing cars.

Background 
In the early 20th century, automotive engines were fairly limited in terms of revolutions per minute (rpm), with 3,000 rpm constituting an upper limit. This meant that the easiest way to increase the power output of an engine was to increase its displacement. In the decade of the 1900s, engine construction necessitated extremely large displacements in order to simply reach the  mark. Furthermore, while it was difficult to fit such a large engine into a car, it was very much possible, and the fact that most of the aircraft engines of the period were liquid-cooled made them more adaptable for automotive use.

Racing

Pre-World War I 
A number of early European automobile manufacturers experimented with the automotive use of aircraft engines, including Hispano-Suiza, Renault, and Rolls-Royce, although it was Fiat that made perhaps the first true aero-engined car when it created the Tipo S76 in 1910. Daryl Murphy speculates that the car was built to capture the world land speed record, which at the time stood at  after the Blitzen Benz had established the mark at the English track Brooklands in 1909. It later returned to continental Europe and ultimately disappeared during World War I.

Sunbeam also manufactured aircraft engines before World War I, and at the suggestion of chief designer Louis Coatalen it decided to install one of its  flathead V12 engines (which would later be developed into the Sunbeam Mohawk) into an automobile chassis in 1913. Nicknamed "Toodles", the car achieved  at Brooklands before it was shipped to the United States, where it was raced by Ralph DePalma.

Sunbeam also developed a second aero-engined car before World War I, which began life as an Indianapolis 500 racing car before Warwick Wright augmented it with a V8 Sunbeam Sirdar airship engine. By 1923, this Sunbeam was listed for sale for £1,000.

Interwar period

1920s 
By the 1920s, after the end of World War I, interest in and development of aero-engined cars reached a new level. Coatalen built another aero-engined racing car, the Sunbeam 350HP, which featured a Sunbeam Manitou engine that had been designed to power Royal Naval Air Service flying boats.

In 1923, Ernest Eldridge began building the Mefistofele, which consisted of a Fiat SB4 chassis and a  Fiat A.12 bis aircraft engine that produced  at 1,800 rpm. The car's name was bestowed upon it by the press due to the tremendous amount of noise and smoke generated by its engine.

Argentine racer Adolfo Scandroglio built his Fiat Botafogo Special in the image of the Mefistofele, using a 1917 Fiat chassis and the same  Fiat A.12 engine that had been chosen by Eldridge. The car, which was named after a famed racehorse, was capable of producing  at 1,800 rpm. In 1949, Scandroglio was killed while racing the Botafogo Special, and the car was presumed to have been lost before its engine was rediscovered in the 1990s. After its rediscovery, the Argentine company Pur Sang, which is noted for creating exact replicas of Alfa Romeo 8C 2300s and Bugatti Type 35s, reconstructed the Botafogo Special. In 2011, the rebuilt car was purchased from Pur Sang by Jay Leno.

In 1923, the Sunbeam 350HP was purchased by Malcolm Campbell, who made modifications to the coachwork as well as the engine in his endeavor to increase its speed.

Perhaps the most well-known aero-engined cars of the interwar period were the series of amateur, chain-driven creations of Louis Zborowski that were each known as Chitty Bang Bang. They later attained fame as the namesake for the children's book Chitty-Chitty-Bang-Bang, written by Ian Fleming, as well as the film and musical of the same title. Although the origin of the name is unknown, it is thought to derive from either a lewd World War I soldier's song or simply the sound of the aircraft engines that powered the cars. The engine could produce  at a relatively modest 1,500 rpm. In 1922, Zborowski returned to Brooklands to achieve his highest ever speed in the car, although that autumn Chitty 1 was destroyed in a racing accident.

Zborowski began working on a second car of the same name, Chitty 2, in 1921. While its use of an older model Mercedes for its chassis made it similar to its predecessor, this iteration of Chitty Bang Bang was powered by an  Benz Bz.IV engine that manufactured . In 1922, Zborowski and his wife took the car on a lengthy excursion across France and Algeria, all the way to the edge of the Sahara, where a dearth of sufficient radiator water caused such substantial engine damage that he was forced to retire the car from racing. Zborowski himself was killed at Monza while competing in the 1924 Italian Grand Prix, and Chitty 2 passed through a series of owners (including Arthur Conan Doyle) before being acquired by the Crawford Auto-Aviation Collection in Cleveland.

The third of Zborowski's cars, Chitty 3, was also built around a modified Mercedes chassis, this time mated to a six-cylinder Mercedes aircraft engine originally rated at  that had been tuned to develop .

Zborowski's fourth and final aero-engined car was the Higham Special, which he named in a nod to his manor, the Higham House. After Zborowski's death at Monza, racing enthusiast J. G. Parry-Thomas bought the car and, after streamlining the body and modifying the engine, rechristened it "Babs". He then took Babs to Pendine, where he achieved  on the sands. After Malcolm Campbell took back the record with a  run in his Blue Bird, Parry-Thomas returned to Pendine in 1927 with a more streamlined Babs. However, on his first run, he was killed in a crash. Parry-Thomas' crew buried Babs in the sand, where it remained until Owen Wyn Owen began excavating it in 1969. Wyn Owen ultimately restored the car to working order by 1985. In 2013, Babs was placed on display at the National Waterfront Museum in Swansea.

The new record made him the first person to surpass the  mark. The very next day, while attempting to re-take the record with the Triplex Special, driver Lee Bible lost his life in a fatal crash that also killed a film cameraman.

1930s 
In 1931, Campbell returned to competition with an upgraded Blue Bird that was sleeker and lower than its predecessor. By 1933, Campbell had created another Blue Bird that was powered by a Rolls-Royce R, which had achieved fame as the engine that helped the Supermarine S.6B seaplane win the Schneider Trophy. However, as performance continued to increase, the relatively limited area of Daytona Beach began to prevent cars from reaching their true top speeds. In September 1935, Campbell took Blue Bird to Utah's Bonneville Salt Flats, where it exceeded .

Ab Jenkins, who in October 1935 had set speed records for one hour and for 24 hours in a factory-modified Duesenberg SJ on a  circuit marked out in the Bonneville Salt Flats, realized that it was no longer possible for a modified production car to compete against aero-engined cars for long-distance speed records. Jenkins had his SJ special further modified, replacing the modified SJ engine with a  Curtiss Conqueror engine. The Conqueror-engined special was named "Mormon Meteor" by a contest held by the Deseret News. The Mormon Meteor set another 24‑hour record in 1937, averaging . Jenkins then commissioned August Duesenberg to build a chassis that was better able to handle the weight, power, and torque of the Conqueror engine.

That year on the salt flats, something of a rivalry developed between Eyston and John Cobb, who had previously raced the  Napier-Railton at Brooklands as well as at Bonneville. For 1937, Cobb had built the teardrop-shaped, streamlined Railton Special, which featured four-wheel drive and two Napier Lion engines.

By 1939, the Mercedes-Benz T80 emerged as the result of a three-year collaboration between German auto racer Hans Stuck, Mercedes-Benz, and Adolf Hitler, the latter of whom had a strong interest in motorsport and was committed to subsidizing German racing endeavors in an effort to showcase his country's technological superiority on the world stage. Costing an astounding 600,000 Reichsmarks, the six-wheeled, streamlined T80 was largely designed and developed by Ferdinand Porsche. The T80's engine ran on a fuel mixture that consisted mostly of methyl alcohol (63%), as well as smaller percentages of benzene, ethanol, acetone, nitrobenzene, avgas, and ether. A world speed record attempt was planned for January 1940 on the  Dessauer Rennstrecke segment of the Reichsautobahn Berlin-Halle/Leipzig, with Stuck at the controls, although the outbreak of World War II prevented the run from ever happening. After surviving the war in storage in Carinthia, Austria, the T80 was ultimately acquired by the Mercedes-Benz Museum in Stuttgart.

Post-World War II

Piston-engined cars 

On one of the requisite two-way runs, Cobb exceeded . Cobb's record would stand for 16 years, and would mark the last time that a piston-engined car would hold the world land speed record.

In 1951, hot rod and drag racing enthusiast Art Arfons began building a series of aero-engined racing cars each known as the Green Monster. The first was a two-ton Ford truck chassis mated to an Allison V-1710 piston engine that was altogether capable of a record  in a quarter-mile drag race. Arfons went on to build 12 more piston-engined Green Monsters before he began experimenting with jet engines.

Turbine-engined cars 

First raced in 1960, the Bluebird-Proteus CN7 was built at a cost of £1 million and powered by a Bristol-Siddeley Proteus turboshaft gas turbine engine. After a serious crash at Bonneville, a tail fin was added to the original design before the Bluebird-Proteus CN7 made another run at the world record at Lake Eyre, South Australia.

A number of other turbine-engined racing cars have been built, including two designed to compete for the world land speed record: Pioneer 2M and the Renault Étoile Filante. Turbine-engined cars have also raced in other types of motorsports, including both open-wheel racing (Lotus 56 and STP-Paxton Turbocar) as well as sports car racing (Howmet TX and Rover-BRM).

Jet-engined cars 

In 1952, Soviet aircraft designer Aleksey Smolin developed the GAZ-TR, which was powered by a turbojet. Built in 1954, it was designed to reach , but due to the lack of adequate tires and an insufficiently long track it failed to exceed  during a test run on November 14, 1954. The GAZ-TR crashed during testing, injuring driver MA Meteleva and leading to the cancellation of the program. Wreckage from the car is on display at the GAZ factory museum.

In 1962, jet engines made their first appearances at Bonneville in three different cars that were each based around the General Electric J47 engine, which also powered the North American F-86 Sabre jet fighter. The second was piloted by Glenn Leasher, who approached the  mark before he was killed in a crash. The third was the needle-nosed Spirit of America, designed and raced by drag racer Craig Breedlove.

In 1964, brothers Art and Walt Arfons arrived at Bonneville with jet cars of their own. Walt had acquired a Westinghouse J46 jet engine, which had been designed for the Vought F7U Cutlass, that he used to power his Wingfoot Express. Art had opted for a General Electric J79, the same engine that powered the Lockheed F-104 Starfighter and the Convair B-58 Hustler bomber, and built a new, jet-powered Green Monster. After Walt Arfons crashed and suffered a heart attack while testing the Wingfoot Express, designer Tom Green was selected to drive the car. Just one week after the Green Monster's record run, Breedlove broke the  barrier before surviving a high-speed crash. The 1964 season ended with Art Arfons retaking the speed title when he made a run at  after making modifications to his engine.

In 1965, Breedlove returned to the Bonneville Salt Flats with his new Spirit of America - Sonic I, which was powered by a GE J79 engine.

Jet-powered drag racing cars have also appeared in National Hot Rod Association (NHRA) events since the 1970s. Jet cars were first sanctioned by the NHRA in 1974, and in 1980 official approval was granted for jet-powered Funny Cars. In 1975, drag racer Phillip "Al" Eierdam created Emergency 1, a jet car powered by a Westinghouse J34 engine and stylized to mimic a fire engine. In the 1980s, Eierdam built and raced the rocket-engined Invader, often against his friend Sammy Miller and his rocket-powered Funny Car, Vanishing Point. The two contested the first side-by-side drag races between rocket-powered cars at Santa Pod Raceway in England. By 1989, Roger Gustin had built more jet cars than anyone else in drag racing and had won the Jet Car Nationals on five separate occasions. During the 2012 season, Elaine Larsen and Marisha Falk both drove jet dragsters powered by General Electric J85 engines capable of producing .

Non-racing applications 

Although rare, aircraft engines have occasionally been chosen as the powerplant for road-going cars. One prime example is the Tucker 48, which was produced in 1947 and 1948 and powered by a flat-six Franklin O-335 helicopter engine. While the original O-335 helicopter engine was air-cooled, Tucker engineers modified it to water cooling, which helped improve the powerplant's durability while also giving the car the automotive industry's first fully sealed water-cooling system.

In the 1960s, British engineer Paul Jameson and transmission specialist John Dodd collaborated to build The Beast, a road car fitted with a  Rolls-Royce Merlin engine. Using a General Motors Turbo-Hydramatic gearbox, the back axle from a Jaguar XJ12, doors cast from a Ford Cortina Mk III, and a fiberglass body reminiscent of a Ford Capri, the finished car had a "phallically long front end" that measured 10 feet. Once listed by the Guinness Book of Records as the world's most powerful road car, by 2012 The Beast had been located in Málaga.

Turbine engines have also been utilized in concept and prototype road cars, such as the three General Motors Firebirds, the Fiat Turbina, and the Chrysler Turbine Car. In 1953, the General Motors XP-21 Firebird I became the first car powered by a gas turbine engine to be built in the United States. Never intended for production, the car was purely a design exercise to determine the feasibility of turbine-powered road cars. The car's body, which was made of plastic reinforced by fiberglass, was designed by Harley J. Earl, while its Whirlfire Turbo-Power engine was developed by Charles L. McCuen and the GM Research Laboratories Division. Driving the rear wheels of the car via a conventional transmission, the engine was able to produce  at 13,000 rpm. Its successor, Firebird II, debuted at General Motors Motorama in 1956. In addition to its regenerative gas turbine, the car featured a titanium body, fully independent suspension, power disc brakes, electric gear selection, and air conditioning that could be individually controlled. The last of GM's Firebirds, Firebird III, was built in 1958. It was the only Firebird to influence any GM production cars; both the 1959 and 1961 Cadillac lineups took styling cues from it. Noted for its extravagant tailfins, Firebird III also broke a number of Earl's styling rules with its very reserved use of chrome and lack of parallel lines. While GM planned a Firebird IV, it never came to fruition, although the three Firebirds did ultimately become the namesake of the Pontiac Firebird pony cars that debuted in 1967.

In 1954, Fiat introduced its own experimental turbine-engined prototype, the Turbina. The car was powered by a two-stage turbine that powered the wheels through a geared reduction unit, while its body was streamlined based on the results of wind tunnel testing.

The turbine engine offered numerous advantages in a road car, including less need for maintenance due to fewer moving parts, general operating smoothness, greater dependability of starting in cold weather, lack of a need for antifreeze, minimal oil consumption, and the ability to run on almost any combustible liquid; the car is claimed to have run on fuels as diverse as peanut oil, Chanel No. 5 perfume, and tequila. Furthermore, the engine was better suited to the relatively continuous operation and constant speeds of aviation use than it was to the more disruptive, stop-and-go conditions of automotive use. On the highway, the car could achieve , but because the engine idled at 22,000 rpm it was less efficient in city driving. In addition to being less fuel efficient than a comparable V8-engined car, the Turbine Car was also substantially more expensive; Jay Leno estimates that the car would have cost around $16,000 if it was ever sold to the public, compared to about $5,000 for a piston-engined car of comparable performance.

Revival 

Even after the period in which they were competitive in the quest for the world land speed record, there has been continued and renewed interest in piston-driven aero-engined cars. One of the earliest cars created during this revival era is the Napier-Bentley, which was built by Peter Morley and David Llewellyn in 1972 in the spirit of the aero-engined cars that raced at Brooklands. The car has been raced regularly, and was once involved in a crash that hospitalized Morley for a few weeks. In 1998, the Napier-Bentley was sold to Chris Williams. Williams has also designed and built the Packard-Bentley, which he envisioned as a tribute to the interwar aero-engined racing cars that competed at Brooklands. Built over a period of seven years, the car, which is nicknamed "Mavis", made its debut at the 2010 Cholmondeley Pageant of Power. The Packard-Bentley is valued at around £350,000.

Aero-engined cars also made an appearance on the British television program Top Gear on 4 March 2012, during the sixth episode of Season 18, when both the BMW-engined "Brutus" and Rolls-Royce-engined "Meteor" were featured. The Brutus was built in Germany shortly after World War II, when a 1908 American LaFrance car was fitted with a  V12 BMW aircraft engine that dates to 1925. The car was created over several years at a workshop at the Auto & Technik Museum in Sinsheim, Germany, which still owns it. According to the Museum, the Brutus can produce  at 1,500 rpm, while its fuel efficiency averages . After driving the car on Top Gear, presenter Jeremy Clarkson described the experience as akin to "doing a crossword while being eaten by a tiger". The Meteor that appeared during the same episode has the chassis from a 1930s Rolls-Royce Phantom and a World War II-vintage,  Rolls-Royce Meteor engine. In 2013, the Meteor went on sale for a price "in excess of £500,000".

See also 

Aircraft engine
Vehicles powered by Napier Lion engines
Blastolene Special (custom-built car powered by a Continental AV1790-5B tank engine)

References 

 *
Cars by engine